Saksahan (or Saksahansky) District is an urban district of Kryvyi Rih City, south-central Ukraine. Named after the river Saksahan that flows through the area. Population: 141,000 (2013 population estimate).

References

Urban districts of Kryvyi Rih